Lolita Davidovich (born July 15, 1961) is a Canadian-born film and television actress, best known for portraying Blaze Starr in the 1989 film Blaze, for which she received a Chicago Film Critics Association Award nomination.

She later had starring roles in films including Leap of Faith (1992), Raising Cain (1992), Intersection (1994), Cobb (1994), Jungle 2 Jungle (1997), Gods and Monsters (1998), Mystery, Alaska (1999), and Play It to the Bone (1999).

Early life
Davidovich was born Lolita Davidović in London, Ontario, the daughter of emigrants from the former Yugoslavia. Her father was from Belgrade (the capital of Serbia), and her mother was from Slovenia. She spoke only Serbian during her early years.

She studied at the Herbert Berghof Studio in New York.

Career
Davidovich began her career playing small parts on television and films. She first received notice co-starring in comedy-drama film Blaze with Paul Newman, for which she beat out 600 other actresses for the title role of the burlesque performer Blaze Starr.

She later starred alongside John Malkovich and Andie MacDowell in 1991 film The Object of Beauty, before earning critical acclaim for her leading performance as an inmate in the HBO drama Prison Stories: Women on the Inside. Davidovich went on to leading roles in films such as the 1992 thriller Raising Cain directed by Brian De Palma, and the drama Leap of Faith, co-starring Steve Martin and Liam Neeson.

She played the love interest of Richard Gere in the 1994 drama Intersection. After starring for director Ron Shelton in Blaze, she also was featured in his films Cobb, Play It to the Bone, Dark Blue, Hollywood Homicide, and in the Oliver Stone film JFK. Davidovich also received Tokyo International Film Festival Award for Best Actress for Younger and Younger, and during 1990s had roles in films Boiling Point, For Better or Worse, Now and Then, Jungle 2 Jungle, Gods and Monsters and Mystery, Alaska.

In 2000s, Davidovich had supporting roles on both film and television. She appeared in several episodes on the first season of the Showtime lesbian-themed drama series, The L Word playing the character Francesca Wolff, and has guest-starred on CSI: Crime Scene Investigation, Criminal Minds, Rizzoli & Isles, Curb Your Enthusiasm, and NCIS. Davidovich voiced Jester in the adventure video game Chronomaster, which also includes the voices of actors Ron Perlman and Brent Spiner. She also voiced Angel Gemini in the adventure game, Of Light and Darkness: The Prophecy, which also includes the voice of actor James Woods.

In 2015, Davidovich made her return to film playing the role of lead character's mother in the romantic drama The Longest Ride based on Nicholas Sparks' novel. Later that year, she was cast in the second season of HBO crime drama True Detective as Taylor Kitsch's character's mother, and ABC prime time soap opera Blood & Oil as Don Johnson's character's ex-wife.

Personal life

Davidovich is married to screenwriter and director Ron Shelton, known for Bull Durham (1988) and White Men Can't Jump (1992). Shelton has directed films in which Davidovich has appeared, including Blaze. They have two children, and reside in Los Angeles and Ojai, California.

Filmography

Film

Television

Video games

References

External links

 

1961 births
Living people
20th-century Canadian actresses
21st-century Canadian actresses
Actresses from London, Ontario
Canadian emigrants to the United States
Canadian film actresses
Canadian people of Serbian descent
Canadian people of Slovenian descent
Canadian television actresses
Canadian voice actresses